The Miguel E. Baca House, in Adelino, New Mexico on what is now New Mexico State Road 47, was built in 1895.  It was listed on the National Register of Historic Places in 1978. The listing included three contributing buildings.

Historic function: Domestic; Agriculture/subsistence; Commerce/trade
Historic subfunction: Department Store; Processing; Single Dwelling; Animal Facility
Criteria: event, architecture/engineering

He operated a store, saloon and dancehall on the property or nearby.

A hipped roof was added in the 1920s. As of 1978 a concrete foundation had recently been inserted, strengthening the walls. 

References

National Register of Historic Places in Valencia County, New Mexico
Houses completed in 1895